Zach, Zac(k) or Zachary Williams may refer to:

Zach Williams (musician) (born 1981), American solo artist
Zac Williams (Australian footballer) (born 1994), Australian rules footballer
Zach Williams & The Reformation, American band
Zac Williams (cyclist) (born 1995), New Zealand cyclist
Zack Williams (American football) (born 1988), American football center
Zack Williams (actor), American actor
Zac Williams (Welsh footballer) (born 2004), Welsh footballer
 Zachary Williams (born 1983), son of Robin Williams (1951–2014)